Sir William John Crossley, 1st Baronet (22 April 1844 – 12 October 1911) was a British engineer and Liberal politician.

W J Crossley was born at Glenburn, near Lisburn, County Antrim. His ancestors had come to Ireland from Lancashire at the time of the Williamite War. He was educated at the Royal School Dungannon and in Bonn.

He was first employed at the machine works of W G Armstrong, Elswick, before joining his brother, Francis to found the Crossley Brothers engineering firm in Manchester in 1867. In 1876 the company began the production of gas engines, and the firm went on to be major employers. In 1876 he married Mabel Gordon Anderson. In 1903 he was given the freedom of the City of Manchester.

In 1906 he was asked to stand as Liberal candidate for the parliamentary constituency of Altrincham, and defeated the sitting Conservative MP, Coningsby Disraeli. He was created a baronet in 1909. He lost his parliamentary seat at the December 1910 election by 119 votes.

Crossley was involved in philanthropic works. He was Chairman of the Manchester Hospital for Consumption and Diseases of the Throat and Chest and built a sanitorium at Delamere Forest for patients from Lancashire towns at his own expense. He was president of Manchester YMCA, and one of the original promoters of the Manchester Ship Canal. He was a teetotaler and treasurer of the United Kingdom Alliance, a temperance organisation.

Sir William and Lady Crossley had five children, Kenneth (1877–1957), Eric (1878–1949), Brian (b. 1886), Lettice (b. 1879) and Cicely (b. 1880).  Both Lettice and Cicely died as infants.

He died aged 67 in 1911, following complications from an operation.

References

External links 

1844 births
1911 deaths
Liberal Party (UK) MPs for English constituencies
UK MPs 1906–1910
People educated at the Royal School Dungannon
People from Lisburn
Baronets in the Baronetage of the United Kingdom
YMCA leaders
Engineers from Manchester
Politicians from Manchester